Park Yong-i (born 14 February 1972) is a North Korean judoka. He competed in the men's lightweight event at the 1992 Summer Olympics.

References

1972 births
Living people
North Korean male judoka
Olympic judoka of North Korea
Judoka at the 1992 Summer Olympics
Place of birth missing (living people)